Kotlaksa is a rural locality (a village) in Dvinitskoye Rural Settlement, Sokolsky District, Vologda Oblast, Russia. The population was 30 as of 2002.

Geography 
Kotlaksa is located 48 km northeast of Sokol (the district's administrative centre) by road. Knyazhevo is the nearest rural locality.

References 

Rural localities in Sokolsky District, Vologda Oblast